Chahar Taq (also Romanized as Chahār Ţāq and Chehār Taq; also known as Chahār Vāg and Chehār) is a village in Golzar Rural District, in the Central District of Bardsir County, Kerman Province, Iran. At the 2006 census, its population was 369, in 79 families.

References 

Populated places in Bardsir County